Cooper Terry (born Vearl Cooper Jr., San Antonio, 1949 – Antioch, California, 1993) was an American-born Italian blues singer, guitarist and harmonica player.

Biography
Cooper was born in San Antonio but he grew up in San Francisco, where he started performing with musicians from the folk blues circuit such as John Lee Hooker and Sonny Terry. In 1972 he moved to Milan,  where he recorded his first album, What I Think About America. Over the course of the 1970s, Cooper played a significant role in establishing the Italian blues scene, performing with artists such as Fabio Treves, Franco Cerri, Ronnie Jones (singer) and Carey Bell.

In 1980 Cooper married vocalist Aida Castignola. Together they recorded the album Feelin' Good (1983). In 1991 Cooper formed the Nite Life Band with Lillo Rogati (bass), Marco Limido (guitar) and Davide Ravioli (drums). Together they recorded two albums, Stormy Desert (1991) and Tribute to the Blues (1992).

Cooper returned to San Francisco in 1993 where he died following a short illness.

Discography
What I Think About America (Carosello) - 1972
Soul Food Blues (Bellaphone) - 1974
Sunny Funny Blues (Divergo) - 1980
Feelin' Good (Appaloosa) - 1983 (with Aida Cooper and Blue Phantom Band)
Stormy Desert (SAAR) - 1991 
Live (Red & Black) - 1991 (with Fabio Treves)
Tribute to the Blues: Long Time Gone (SAAR) - 1992 
Take a Ride with Cooper T (Blue Flame) - 2002

Collaborations
 Henri Chaix & Mickey Baker, A Jazz and Blues Digest (Disques Office) – 1976
 VV. AA., Uncle Sam Blues (Blues Encore) – 1996

References 

1949 births
1993 deaths
American people of Italian descent
American expatriates in Italy
Electric blues musicians
Musicians from Milan
Italian blues guitarists
Italian blues musicians